Gusikha is a rural locality (a selo) in Barguzinsky District, Republic of Buryatia, Russia. The population was 270 as of 2010. There are 8 streets.

Geography 
Gusikha is located 73 km southwest of Barguzin (the district's administrative centre) by road. Ust-Barguzin is the nearest rural locality.

References 

Rural localities in Barguzinsky District